Club de Alto Rendimiento Especializado Independiente del Valle, known simply as Independiente del Valle, is a professional football club based in Sangolquí, Ecuador, that currently plays in the Ecuadorian Serie A. 

Founded in 1958, the club plays its home games at Estadio Banco Guayaquil, which opened in March 2021 and has a capacity for 12,000. In the 2013 Ecuadorian Serie A Independiente finished runners-up, and they won their first league title in 2021.  

In CONMEBOL competitions, it reached the final of the 2016 Copa Libertadores after famously defeating powerhouses River Plate and Boca Juniors, it won its first ever title in  2019, Three years later the club would become one of the few two-time Sudamericana champions after defeating São Paulo in the 2022 final.

The club is also known for producing youth talent, and a good example of this is the club's U-20 Copa Libertadores title in 2020. Some well-known footballers the club has produced are Jefferson Montero, Junior Sornoza, Arturo Mina, Cristian Ramírez, Moisés Caicedo and Piero Hincapié.

History
The club was founded on 1 March 1958 as Club Deportivo Independiente by Jose Terán, a football fan from Sangolquí, along with a group of friends including José Díaz, Jorge Atapuma, the Negro Sanguano, Tomás Zaldumbide and Marino Guayasamín. In 1977, two years after the death of José Terán, the club's name was changed to Club Social y Deportivo Independiente José Terán in honor of its founder. The name and initial club colors (red and white) were inspired by Argentine club Club Atlético Independiente.

In 1995 the club reached the Segunda Categoría (3rd Division) for the second time. After winning the Segunda Categoría in 2007, the club changed its name to Independiente del Valle and adopted the current colors (blue and black). Los Negriazules achieved promotion to the Ecuadorian Serie A for the first time ever in the 2010 season, after winning the 2009 Serie B. 

In the 2013 Serie A, the club finished runners-up on the aggregate table. Independiente del Valle made its first international participation that same year, in the 2013 Copa Sudamericana, where it was eliminated in the second stage by Universidad de Chile after having beat Venezuelan club Deportivo Anzoategui in the first stage. The next year, the Ecuadorian club made its first Copa Libertadores participation and second overall international participation, with the 2014 edition. In that edition, the club was eliminated after placing 3rd in their group. 

In July 2014, the club officially changed its name from "Independiente del Valle" to Club de Alto Rendimiento Especializado Independiente del Valle. Although the club had changed its name already, it had never been made official by the Ecuadorian Football Federation until that point.

Independiente del Valle unexpectedly reached the finals of the 2016 Copa Libertadores with incredible odds, being compared to Leicester City's Premier League title that same year. Independiente began its knockout stage run by beating Copa Libertadores defending champions, Argentina's River Plate, in the round of 16 2–1 on aggregate. In the quarter-finals they defeated Pumas UNAM on penalties 5–3, after an aggregate score of 3–3. The club subsequently faced Argentina's giant Boca Juniors in the semi-final, defeating them 5–3 on aggregate, including a 3–2 victory at the famous La Bombonera stadium. In the finals, the Ecuadorians faced Colombia's Atlético Nacional. In the first leg played at Estadio Olímpico Atahualpa on 20 July, the match finished 1–1. Independiente's fairy tale story came to a conclusion after a 1–0 loss in the second leg with the series ending 2–1 in favor of the Colombians.

In November 2019, Independiente del Valle played their first ever Copa Sudamericana final, and only its second ever CONMEBOL final, where they defeated Club Atlético Colón 3–1 in Asunción. This was the Ecuadorian club's first ever historic title. It was considered a major upset because Colón had a richer history and a much bigger fanbase, with around 40,000 fans at the stadium versus only 500 Ecuadorians.

In February 2020, the club lost the 2020 Recopa Sudamericana against the champion of the 2019 Copa Libertadores, Flamengo. The first leg in Quito was a 2–2 draw, but in the second leg at Estadio Maracana, Flamengo won 3–0 and became the champion with a 5–2 aggregate score.

Performance in CONMEBOL competitions 

 Copa Libertadores: 7 appearances 
2014: Group Stage
2015: First Stage
2016: Runners-up
2017: Second Qualifying stage
2018: Second Qualifying stage
2020: Round of 16
2021: Group Stage
Copa Sudamericana: 5 appearances
2013: Second Stage
2014: Second Stage
2019: Champions
2021: Round of 16
2022: Champions
Recopa Sudamericana: 2 appearances
2020: Runners-up
2023: Champions

Facilities

Stadiums 
Estadio Rumiñahui was inaugurated in 1941 and has a capacity for 8,000 spectators. 

For international tournaments the club use larger stadiums like the Estadio Olímpico Atahualpa in Quito that has a 38,500-capacity.

In March 2021, the club opened a new 12,000-capacity stadium called Estadio Banco Guayaquil. It meets modern FIFA standards and is able to hold international matches, unlike their old stadium. It also has three grandstands with a roof, compared to Estadio Rumiñahui, which only had one grandstand.

Training Center

The club has its own training center located in Sangolquí which is called Centro de Alto Rendimiento. It has seven football fields, one of them with artificial grass. The training center also has rooms to accommodate players, dining room, parking, a gym (for the first-team and reserves), indoor pool and administrative offices.

Reserve team 

Since 2018, the club has a reserve team in the Ecuadorian Serie B, formerly named Alianza Cotopaxi SC. After the promotion, the club changed name to C.D. Independiente Juniors.

Players

First-team squad

World Cup players
The following players were chosen to represent their country at the FIFA World Cup while contracted to Independiente del Valle.

 W. Moisés Ramírez (2022)

Players out on loan

Managers

Current technical staff
 Renato Paiva (head coach)
 Felipe Sánchez Mateos (assistant coach)
  Francisco Trujillo  (fitness coach) 
 Ricardo Pereira (goalkeeper coach)
 Luis Piedrahita (performance analyst)
 Wendy Montiel (doctor)
 Javier Echeverría (physiotherapist)
 Camila Nájera (physiotherapist)
 Junior Alcócer (equipment manager)
 Francisco Alcócer (equipment assistant)

List of managers
 Nelson Brito (2007 - April 26, 2008)
 Daniel Silguero (April 30, 2008 - November 8, 2008)
 Janio Pinto (November 8, 2008 - April 27,2009)
 Guillermo Duró (May 11, 2010 – Sept 21, 2010)
 Julio Asad (Sept 22, 2010 – April 17, 2011)
 Carlos Sevilla (April 17, 2011 – Sept 20, 2012)
 Álvaro Carcelén (Sept 21, 2012 – Sept 30, 2012)
 Pablo Repetto (Sept 25, 2012 – Jul 27, 2016)
 Alexis Mendoza (Jul 29, 2016 – Dec 6, 2017)
 Gabriel Schürrer (Dec 10, 2017 — 2018)
 Ismael Rescalvo (Jun 28, 2018 — April 27, 2019)
 Yuri Solano (April 27, 2019 - May 7, 2019)
 Miguel Ángel Ramírez (May 7, 2019 — Dec 19, 2020)
 Renato Paiva (Dec 25, 2020 —)

Honours

Domestic

Serie A:
Winners (1): 2021
Runners-up (1): 2013
Copa Ecuador: 
Winners (1): 2022
Supercopa Ecuador: 
Winners (1): 2023
Serie B: 
Winners (1): 2009
Segunda Categoría: 
Winners (1): 2007

International

Copa Libertadores: 
Runners-up (1): 2016
Copa Sudamericana: 
Winners (2): 2019, 2022
Recopa Sudamericana: 
Winners (1): 2023
Runners-up (1): 2020

Under-20 team

U-20 Copa Libertadores:
Winners (1): 2020
Runners-up (2): 2018, 2022

References

External links

  

 
1958 establishments in Ecuador
Association football clubs established in 1958
Football clubs in Ecuador
I